Philippe Ouédraogo may refer to:
 Philippe Ouédraogo (cardinal) (born 1945), cardinal from Burkina Faso
 Philippe Ouédraogo (politician) (born 1942), politician from Burkina Faso